The Last Son is a 2021 American action drama Western film directed by Tim Sutton. It stars Sam Worthington, Colson Baker and Thomas Jane. It debuted at the Deauville American Film Festival on September 6, 2021, and officially released on December 10, 2021.

Plot
Set in the late 19th century Sierra Nevada, Isaac LeMay (Worthington), has been cursed by a terrible prophecy and in order to prevent his own murder from the hands of his own children, he hunts down his own offspring, including cold-blooded murderer and outlaw, Cal (Baker), who is his last remaining son. While U.S. Marshal Solomon (Jane) and bounty hunters track Cal down.

Cast
 Sam Worthington as Isaac LeMay
 Colson Baker as Cal / Lionel
 Thomas Jane as Solomon, a U.S. Marshal who was raised by the Cheyenne, which has taught him excellent tracking skills
 Heather Graham as Anna, Cal's mother and a prostitute
 Alex Meraz as Patty
 Emily Marie Palmer as Megan

Production
In 2010, the screenplay The Last Son of Isaac LeMay, written by Greg Johnson, was featured on the Black List of that year's most-liked unproduced screenplays.

The film was shot entirely on-location in Montana.

Thomas Jane and Courtney Lauren Penn of Renegade Entertainment executive produced with Redbox Entertainment, 828 Media Capital and VMI Worldwide as producers. Jessica Bennett and Sherri Hewett of VMI Worldwide co-produced.

Reception 
On Rotten Tomatoes, The Last Son has a 9% approval rating based on 11 reviews, with an average score of 4.7/10. Christy Lemire from RogerEbert.com gave it 2 stars saying "offers some striking visuals and a couple of compelling performances. But for the most part, this high-concept Western is too much of an empty drag to ever grab you".

References

External links
 

2021 films
2021 Western (genre) films
2021 action drama films
Films set in the 19th century
Films shot in Montana
American Western (genre) films
2020s English-language films
2020s American films